Franklin Coggins (May 22, 1944 – October 30, 1994) was an American professional baseball player.

He was traded along with Roy Foster and cash from the Milwaukee Brewers to the Cleveland Indians for Russ Snyder and Max Alvis during spring training on April 4, 1970.

Coggins' professional career lasted 11 seasons (1963–1973). He played parts of three seasons in Major League Baseball as a second baseman with the Washington Senators (1967–1968) and Chicago Cubs (1972).  His most sustained period in the Major Leagues came with the 1968 Senators, for whom he appeared in 62 games and batted .175 with 30 hits in 171 at bats, including six doubles and one triple.

Coggins died at age 50 in Atlanta, Georgia.

References

1944 births
1994 deaths
African-American baseball players
Baseball players from Georgia (U.S. state)
Washington Senators (1961–1971) players
Chicago Cubs players
Rocky Mount Senators players
Geneva Senators players
Burlington Senators players
York White Roses players
Savannah Indians players
Tacoma Cubs players
Buffalo Bisons (minor league) players
Hawaii Islanders players
Savannah Braves players
Wichita Aeros players
Major League Baseball second basemen
People from Griffin, Georgia
20th-century African-American sportspeople